Inner Knowledge is the debut solo studio album by Bengali Baul singer and musician Paban Das Baul. The album was released in the United Kingdom on 4 November 1997 by Real World Records and was produced by Michael Brook.

Production and recording
The tracks used for the album were recorded in 1995 recording week at Real World Studios in England.

Release and reception

The album was released in the United Kingdom on 4 November 1997 by Real World Records. The album was re-released on 4 December 2006 by Womad Select.

Track listing

Personnel
Adapted from the 1997 release

 Paban Das Baul – lead vocals, khamak, dotara, dubki
 Subal Das Baul – vocals
 Nitya Gopal Das – vocals, dotara, khamak
 Tinkori Chakravarty – dubki
 Mimlu Sen – ektara, cymbals

Additional personnel
 Ben Findlay – recorded and mixed 
 Tchad Blake – recorded and mixed 
 Anna-Karin Sundin – Graphic design
 Carlos Muñoz-Yagüe – photography
 Vince Goodsell – instruments photography
 Stephen Lovell-Davis – the front cover, back inlay photography
 Mimlu Sen – sleeve notes

References

External links
 
 
 
 

1997 debut albums
Paban Das Baul albums
Real World Records albums